Superior Lake is a dry lake basin in the Mojave Desert of San Bernardino County, California,  north of Barstow. Through the Holocene, this three-lake system was one body of water.

See also
 List of lakes in California

References

External links
 

Endorheic lakes of California
Lakes of the Mojave Desert
Lakes of San Bernardino County, California
Lakes of California
Lakes of Southern California